Freya (born  April 2009 - 4 August 2022) was a tabby cat owned by the former Chancellor of the Exchequer of the United Kingdom George Osborne and his family.

Freya went missing from the Osbornes' house in Notting Hill when she was just a few months old, and after searching West London for her, the family assumed she had died or had become lost. In June 2012, Osborne's wife received a call telling her that Freya was alive, and the family brought her home. In September 2012, Freya shared the role of Chief Mouser to the Cabinet Office with the Downing Street cat Larry. In November 2014, Freya was retired from the position to the Kent countryside but ended up staying in the Oval area of London. She died on the 4 August 2022.

Career

On 16 September 2012, Nigel Nelson from The People reported the Prime Minister David Cameron had sacked Larry from his position as Chief Mouser to the Cabinet Office and installed Freya instead. Nelson revealed that Cameron had become fed up with Larry's laziness.

Cameron decided to replace Larry when he refused to move from his chair to chase a mouse on September 13. Nelson explained, "The final straw came on Thursday when Mr Cameron caught Larry cat-napping on his chair in his No.10 study as another mouse scurried across the room. When he tried to wake Larry to do his duty one eye opened but the moggy wouldn't budge."

Cameron drafted in Freya to patrol Numbers 10, 11 and 12 Downing Street as she is a "tougher" and a "more street-wise predator." Freya was reported to be the more dominant cat over Larry and a more effective mouser, reportedly because her days as a stray had "hardened" her.

Freya has become one of 100,000 cats employed by the Government to keep the number of mice down. On 16 October 2012, police had to break up a fight between Larry and Freya outside Number 10. Rosa Prince from The Daily Telegraph reported that Freya "appeared to have the best of the confrontation". The Prime Minister's spokeswoman stated that Freya and Larry were able to "co-exist" and added that she would not comment further on the two cats' adventures.

In May 2014, Freya strayed over a mile from Downing Street and had to be rescued and returned by a charity worker. In August 2014, Freya was hit by a car in Whitehall and was subsequently treated by a vet. George Osborne said he was "very grateful" to those who came to the aid of his pet.  Following these events, Freya was sent to the Kent countryside to allow her to exercise her desire to roam. In February 2015 she moved to the Oval area of London, to live with Robert Alexander OBE, the Head of Government Hospitality. The operator of the Palmerston Twitter account (the Foreign Office cat) tweeted that Freya died in 2022.

See also
List of individual cats
Freya, Norse goddess (namesake)

References

2009 animal births
Individual cats in England
Individual cats in politics
Working cats
Chief Mousers to the Cabinet Office